Allan Christian de Almeida (born 24 February 1994), commonly known as Allan, is a Brazilian footballer who currently plays as a midfielder for União Suzano.

Career statistics

Club

Notes

References

1994 births
Living people
Brazilian footballers
Brazilian expatriate footballers
Brazil youth international footballers
Association football midfielders
Campeonato Brasileiro Série C players
São Paulo FC players
Esporte Clube Noroeste players
Nacional Atlético Clube (SP) players
FC Shukura Kobuleti players
Boa Esporte Clube players
Tupynambás Futebol Clube players
Grêmio Esportivo Juventus players
Camboriú Futebol Clube players
Clube Atlético Juventus players
União Suzano Atlético Clube players
Brazilian expatriate sportspeople in Georgia (country)
Expatriate footballers in Georgia (country)
Footballers from São Paulo